Alvares tile factory is a Mangalore tile factory in Mangalore. The tiles produced by this factory were in great demand throughout the Indian subcontinent and East Africa.

History
The firm was established in 1878 by Mr. Simon Alvares.

References

Companies based in Mangalore
Indian companies established in 1878
Manufacturing companies established in 1878